Bradley Wayne Penny (born May 24, 1978) is an American former professional baseball pitcher. Penny played in Major League Baseball (MLB) for the Florida / Miami Marlins, Los Angeles Dodgers, Boston Red Sox, San Francisco Giants, St. Louis Cardinals, and Detroit Tigers, and in Nippon Professional Baseball (NPB) for the Fukuoka SoftBank Hawks. He was an All Star in 2006 and 2007.

Early life
Penny was born in Blackwell, Oklahoma.  He graduated from Broken Arrow Senior High where he was an All-State selection and Frontier Conference Pitcher of the Year.

Professional career

Draft and minor leagues
He was selected by the Arizona Diamondbacks in the 5th round of the 1996 MLB draft, and signed with the Diamondbacks on June 4, 1996.

He was immediately sent to the Arizona Summer League, where he ranked fourth in the league in ERA (2.36) and was named Arizona's Organizational Pitcher of the Month in August. With the South Bend Silver Hawks in 1997, he was 10–5 with an ERA of 2.73 in 25 starts.

In 1998, with the High Desert Mavericks, he went 14–5 with a 2.96 ERA in 28 starts and was named to Baseball America's first team Minor League All-Stars, the California League Pitcher of the Year, California League Most Valuable Player, Arizona Diamondbacks Minor League Player of the Year and "A" Level Player of the Year.

In 1999, he started the year with the El Paso Diablos at the Diamondbacks Double-A level, and had a 2–7 record with a 4.80 ERA when he was traded to the Florida Marlins along with Abraham Núñez and Vladimir Núñez in exchange for relief pitcher Matt Mantei. The Marlins assigned him to their Double-A team in Portland. Penny combined with Luis Arroyo for the first no-hitter in Portland history in his first game in the Marlins' organization on August 8.

Major League career

Florida Marlins
After a good spring, he made the Marlins starting rotation in 2000. He made his first MLB appearance and first start on April 7, 2000, against the Colorado Rockies. Penny pitched seven innings, giving up only one run, to get his first MLB win in the Marlins' 4–3 victory. At the end of the season, he ranked second among NL rookies in winning percentage (.533), third in wins, tied for fourth with 22 games started and was sixth in both innings pitched and strikeouts (80).

In 2001, Penny pitched 205 innings for the Marlins. He finished 10-10 in 31 starts. In 2002, due to injuries and ineffectiveness, Penny saw his ERA rise from the previous season, from 3.69 in 2001, his ERA in 2002 was at 4.66 in just 24 starts.

In 2003, Penny bounced back, finishing the 2003 campaign with 14 wins for the Marlins and helping them reach the playoffs. Penny collected the win in Florida's NLCS clinching victory over the Chicago Cubs and in the World Series against the New York Yankees he went 2–0 with a 2.19 ERA in his two starts.

Penny started the 2004 season with an 8-8 record with a 3.15 ERA in 21 starts before being traded to the Dodgers.

Los Angeles Dodgers

On July 30, 2004, Penny was traded along with Hee-Seop Choi and pitching prospect Bill Murphy to the Los Angeles Dodgers in exchange for Guillermo Mota, Juan Encarnación, and Paul Lo Duca. However, in the first inning of his second start with the Dodgers he suffered a serious arm injury and went on the disabled list. He returned in September, only to promptly reinjure himself after three innings in his first start off the DL. His recovery time from his injury caused him to begin the following season on the disabled list, but he rejoined the Dodgers on April 24, 2005, and proceeded to have a solid season.

On June 12, 2005, Penny signed a three-year contract extension worth a guaranteed $25 million and a team option for the 2009 season.

Penny was named by Houston Astros manager Phil Garner as the National League's starting pitcher in the 2006 Major League Baseball All-Star Game. He hurled two innings, allowing one home run to Vladimir Guerrero, striking out the side (Ichiro Suzuki, Derek Jeter, and David Ortiz) in the first inning, and receiving a no-decision.

On September 23, 2006, against the Arizona Diamondbacks, Penny joined the small club of pitchers who have struck out four batters in one inning. Due to the uncaught third strike rule, Penny was credited with striking out Chad Tracy, but because catcher Russell Martin failed to catch the ball cleanly, Tracy was allowed to attempt to run to first base, and made it there before he could be thrown out. Despite giving up three runs in the inning, Penny recorded three more strikeouts to complete the four-strikeout inning.

He also threw the fastest fastball of all NL starters in 2006, averaging 93.9 miles per hour.

Penny had a strong start to 2007 that continued throughout the season, with an ERA of 3.03 for the season and was the first Dodger pitcher to start out with a 12–1 record since Phil Regan went 14–1 in 1966. Penny was selected to the All-Star game for a second consecutive year. Penny had several memorable outings in 2007, including on May 7, 2007, against his former team, the Florida Marlins, Penny struck out a career-high 14 in a Dodger 6–1 win. Another memorable performance was against the San Diego Padres in a pitcher's duel against All-Star teammate Jake Peavy just before the All-Star break. The match ended in a draw with both pitchers going seven innings giving up one earned run on five hits. Penny struck out seven, while Peavy struck out six. The Padres would eventually win the game 3–1 in 12 innings.  He also threw the fastest fastball of all NL starters in 2007, averaging 93.4 miles per hour.

Besides being a hard throwing pitcher, Penny developed into a good hitting pitcher since being traded to the Dodgers. In 2006, his batting average was .185, but was above .200 for most of the season and was as high as .240 before Penny ended the year in an 0 for 12 slump. He batted .246 in 2007. Penny also had six doubles, seven RBI, and seven runs scored.

For the 2008 season, Penny was selected as opening day starter against the San Francisco Giants, shutting them out over seven innings, but he struggled in 2008 overall, going 6–9 with a 6.27 ERA and a stint on the DL. After coming back from the DL in September, Penny made a few appearances out of the bullpen but struggled in that role and returned to the DL. After the season, the Dodgers declined his option year, making Penny a free agent.

Boston Red Sox

On January 9, 2009, Penny signed a one-year deal with the Boston Red Sox with a base salary of $5M. Incentives and performance bonuses were included to increase the total deal another $3M.

Penny recorded his 100th career win on June 17, 2009, against his former team the Florida Marlins, in a five inning effort only giving up one unearned run.  The win came on the Red Sox's 500th consecutive sell out at Fenway Park.

During his last five starts with the Red Sox, Penny was 0–4 with a 9.11 ERA. After a disastrous start against the rival Yankees, it was decided on August 22, 2009, that Penny would be replaced in the rotation by veteran knuckleballer Tim Wakefield who was coming off the disabled list soon. During Wakefield's August 26 start, Penny was placed in the bullpen as insurance, but was never needed with Wakefield pitching a strong seven inning effort giving up only one run. With Wakefield completing a healthy start, reliever Billy Wagner being added to the roster, and Penny not wanting to be a reliever, the Red Sox granted his wish to be released late that night. During his time in Boston, Penny's record was 7–8, with a 5.61 ERA.

San Francisco Giants
On August 31, 2009, Penny signed with the San Francisco Giants after clearing waivers. The Giants paid Penny only the pro-rated remnant of a $400k MLB minimum salary (i.e. under $100k), with the Boston Red Sox picking up the remainder of his $5M salary for the year.
 In his debut, Penny pitched eight shutout innings in a 4–0 win over Philadelphia. Penny demonstrated his past success in the National League, going 4-1 in 6 starts for the Giants. He became a free agent after the season.

St. Louis Cardinals
On December 10, 2009, Penny agreed to a one-year contract with the St. Louis Cardinals.
On May 21, 2010, Penny hit his first career grand slam, to give his team an 8–4 lead during interleague play against the Angels. He was pulled the next inning with an injury and therefore did not earn the win.  The injury was an aggravation of a pre-existing oblique muscle strain that landed him on the disabled list for the remainder of the season.

Detroit Tigers

On January 18, 2011, Penny agreed to a one-year $3 million contract with the Detroit Tigers. Being added to the Tigers roster reunited Penny with past teammates in Miguel Cabrera from the Marlins and Victor Martinez from the Red Sox.

Penny started off the season with the Tigers as their number two starter, behind Justin Verlander and in front of Max Scherzer. In exception to May, in which Penny went 3–1 in five starts with an ERA of 3.24, Penny had a sub-par first half of the season, going 6–6 with a 4.50 ERA, and with the Tigers' acquisition of Doug Fister in July, in addition to the success of Scherzer, Penny was moved to the number four spot in the rotation. Penny had a worse second half, going 5–5 with a 6.53 ERA after the All-Star break. Overall, Penny's 5.30 ERA was the worst among qualified starters in 2011.

When the Tigers went to the Postseason, he was added to the roster in the bullpen. He appeared in Game 6 of the American League Championship Series against the Texas Rangers, his only appearance in both the Division and Championship series, and pitched 1.2 innings while giving up 5 runs.  The Tigers went on to lose that game 15–5, which sent the Rangers to the World Series.  The Rangers lost in 7 games to Penny's former club, the St. Louis Cardinals.

Fukuoka SoftBank Hawks 
On February 5, 2012, Penny agreed to a one-year $3 million contract with the Fukuoka SoftBank Hawks.

However, after allowing six runs and five stolen bases in only  innings in his NPB debut game, Penny claimed that he injured his elbow and asked to be removed from the game.  He was immediately sent to the disabled list and took two MRI exams (one in Fukuoka, and one in the United States), but both results were negative.
Penny was released from his contract a month later, on May 8.  He was a "huge disappointment,"  and a local newspaper reported that signing Penny was "the worst decision in franchise history."

Second stint with the San Francisco Giants 
On May 18, 2012, Penny signed a minor league contract with the San Francisco Giants. On June 30, Penny faced the Cincinnati Reds in his first game of the season. He went 2.1 innings, giving up 0 hits and 0 earned runs while striking out 1 batter. He finished the season 0-1 with a 6.11 ERA while appearing in 22 games.

Kansas City Royals
Penny signed a minor league deal with the Kansas City Royals on January 16, 2014. He was released on March 7.

Second stint with the Marlins
On June 18, 2014, Penny agreed to a minor-league contract with the Miami Marlins. He made his first start with the club on August 9, 2014, against the Cincinnati Reds.

Chicago White Sox
On December 16, 2014, Penny signed a minor league deal with the Chicago White Sox. After a mixed spring training in 2015 (1-1 record with a 6.89 ERA in 15.2 innings), he failed to win a spot in Chicago's rotation and played with their Triple-A affiliate, the Charlotte Knights, in the International League. He elected free agency on November 6, 2015.

Toronto Blue Jays
On December 17, 2015, Penny signed a minor league contract with the Toronto Blue Jays that included an invitation to spring training. On March 18, 2016, Penny announced his retirement.

Personal life
In October 2009, Penny began dating professional dancer Karina Smirnoff. They became engaged in October 2010, but ended the engagement in December 2011.

Penny subsequently began dating former Oklahoma City Thunder dancer Kaci Cook. They became engaged in January 2013, and married on August 1, 2013 in Hawaii.

See also

 List of Major League Baseball annual wins leaders
 List of Major League Baseball single-inning strikeout leaders

References

External links

1978 births
Living people
American expatriate baseball players in Canada
American expatriate baseball players in Japan
Arizona League Diamondbacks players
Arizona League Giants players
Baseball players at the 1999 Pan American Games
Baseball players from Oklahoma
Boston Red Sox players
Brevard County Manatees players
Calgary Cannons players
Charlotte Knights players
Detroit Tigers players
El Paso Diablos players
Florida Marlins players
Fresno Grizzlies players
Fukuoka SoftBank Hawks players
High Desert Mavericks players
Jupiter Hammerheads players
Las Vegas 51s players
Los Angeles Dodgers players
Major League Baseball pitchers
Miami Marlins players
National League All-Stars
National League wins champions
New Orleans Zephyrs players
Pan American Games medalists in baseball
Pan American Games silver medalists for the United States
People from Blackwell, Oklahoma
People from Broken Arrow, Oklahoma
Portland Sea Dogs players
San Francisco Giants players
San Jose Giants players
South Bend Silver Hawks players
St. Louis Cardinals players
United States national baseball team players
Vero Beach Dodgers players
Medalists at the 1999 Pan American Games